The United Nations Educational, Scientific and Cultural Organization (UNESCO) World Heritage Sites are places of importance to cultural or natural heritage as described in the UNESCO World Heritage Convention, established in 1972. Cultural heritage consists of monuments (such as architectural works, monumental sculptures, or inscriptions), groups of buildings, and sites (including archaeological sites). Natural features (consisting of physical and biological formations), geological and physiographical formations (including habitats of threatened species of animals and plants), and natural sites which are important from the point of view of science, conservation or natural beauty, are defined as natural heritage. Afghanistan accepted the convention on March 20, 1979, making its sites eligible for inclusion on the list.

, there are two World Heritage Sites in Afghanistan, and a further four on the tentative list. The first site listed was the Minaret and Archaeological Remains of Jam, in 2002. The second site was the Cultural Landscape and Archaeological Remains of the Bamiyan Valley, in 2003. Both sites are cultural, and were placed to the List of World Heritage in Danger immediately upon inscription.

World Heritage Sites
UNESCO lists sites under ten criteria; each entry must meet at least one of the criteria. Criteria i through vi are cultural, and vii through x are natural.

Tentative list 

In addition to sites inscribed on the World Heritage List, member states can maintain a list of tentative sites that they may consider for nomination. Nominations for the World Heritage List are only accepted if the site was previously listed on the tentative list. , Afghanistan lists four properties on its tentative list.

References

Nature conservation in Afghanistan
Afghanistan
 
Afghanistan
World Heritage Sites